Liesbet Dotulong (born 2 February 1932), better known by her stage name Maria Menado, is a Malay actress and producer who is known for her contributions to Malaysian cinema in the 1950s and 1960s. At the height of her fame she was voted “Malaya’s Most Beautiful” by Times Magazine and the “Best Dressed Woman in South East Asia” by publisher United Press International. In addition to acting, she also sang and went on to direct and produce films under her own production company, Maria Menado Productions.

Menado is Minahasan and was born in Manado, North Sulawesi (present Indonesia). She was the cousin of Indonesian actress Mimi Mariani.

Early life
Liesbet Dotulong was born in the Minahasa Regency of Indonesia in 1932. When she was seven years old, her parents died, and she was sent to live with an aunt and uncle in Makassar. They eventually moved to Jakarta to escape fighting between the Dutch and Indonesian nationalists. By the time Liesbet was seventeen, she was known locally for her beauty, and appeared as a fashion model in magazines and newspapers. In 1950 she accepted a screen offer from the Shaw Brothers' Malay Film Productions in Singapore.

While she was with her aunt and uncle in Malaysia, Liesbet became interested in the Maria Hertogh riots, which were occurring at the time. Maria Hertogh was a Dutch girl who was sent to live with a Malay Muslim family, and became the subject of a highly publicized custody battle which led to religious race riots in Singapore. Due to Liesbet's interest in the case, and her birthplace of Manado, Indonesia, she was dubbed "Maria of Manado" by friends. The name stuck, and for the rest of her career in films she was referred to as Maria Menado.

Career
After Maria's photos appeared in newspapers and magazines as a fashion model, her career as a film actress began in 1951. Shaw Brothers offered Maria the role of the leading lady alongside P. Ramlee in the film "Penghidupan".

However, it was her role as a vampire in the film "Pontianak" that gave Maria fame in 1957. "Pontianak" was the first Malay horror film. The script for this film is a collaboration with her ex-husband, A. Razak Sheikh Mohamed. Maria supplied the vampire stories she had heard while in Indonesia and they weaved the film's plot together.

Her transformation from a beautiful woman to a hunchback and then a vampire took hours of decorating. Maria also had to lean back without moving so that the change could be filmed little by little. Unlike now, there were no computer graphics back then to make corrections, and everything had to be done manually. However, the film reaches a fairly realistic level as can be seen from the reports of several people fainting after watching the shocking scenes. Its screening in Cathay cinemas lasted for 12 days. This is a major achievement, especially because Malay films have never been shown in Cathay cinemas. Maria then acted in the following two sequels, Dendam Pontianak (1957) and Sumpah Pontianak (1958).

At the height of her fame, she was given the role of an evil character alongside Shammi Kapoor in a Hindi film titled "Singapore". The film was shot in Singapore and Mumbai. In a period of 12 years, Maria acted in more than 20 films including her own production, Maria Menado Production (M. M Production) through the film Siti Zubaidah in 1961. She was the first Malay female film producer.

Maria herself plays the main role as Siti Zubaidah. Her involvement as a producer is not only proud but she has played the role of producer and actress at the same time which is rarely done by a producer.

Three other films produced by her company are Darahku, Bunga Tanjung and Pontianak Kembali.

Personal life

Marriage with the Sultan of Pahang
For special celebrations, Maria and other artists will be invited to the Pahang palace to perform, especially during the Sultan's birthday. On one of these visits, Sultan Abu Bakar Ri'ayatuddin proposed to her. After much consideration, Maria got married in 1963 at the age of 30. The marriage not only ended her film career but also meant that her films could no longer be shown in cinemas or on television. The Royal Council of the Pahang Palace ruled that because Maria is the consort of the Sultan, the screening of her films is not allowed in the state of Pahang. However, the film was not shown in the entire country. With that, Ho Ah Loke, the owner of Cathay Keris got stuck with Maria's films. Because the films took up so much air-conditioning space in Ho's house, he later had to throw them away because the films had become a source of quarrels with his wife.

After the death of the Sultan of Pahang, Maria moved from Pekan to Kuala Lumpur. At that time, he requested Sultan Ahmad Shah, the current Sultan of Pahang who heads the Royal Council of Pahang Palace, so that his films would be allowed to be screened again. His Majesty gave permission, but at that time, the films he acted in were thrown into a mine that was no longer used. It is not known why Ho did not approach Maria or the state museums to donate the films. The loss of those films is a huge loss, a priceless loss for Malaysian film history.

Now, Maria intends to produce and direct a new version of "Pontianak" instead so she can leave her mark — this time in color.

Awards and nominations
  Darjah Indera Mahkota Pahang ( D.I.M.P) - Dato' (1980)
 Darjah Sri Sultan Ahmad Shah Pahang (S.S.A.P) - Dato' Sri (24.10.2017)

Filmography

References

External links

Converts to Islam
20th-century Malaysian actresses
20th-century Malaysian women singers
Malaysian women film directors
People from Manado
Minahasa people
1932 births
Living people